John William Rainey (December 21, 1880 – May 4, 1923) was a U.S. Representative from Illinois.

Biography
Born in Chicago, Illinois, Rainey attended the public schools of his native city, De La Salle Institute, and the Kent College of Law.
He was admitted to the bar in 1910 and commenced the practice of law in Chicago.
Rainey served as assistant judge of the probate court of Cook County 1910–1912, and served as clerk of the circuit court 1912–1916.

Rainey was elected as a Democrat to the Sixty-fifth Congress to fill the vacancy caused by the death of Charles Martin.
He was reelected to the Sixty-sixth, Sixty-seventh, and Sixty-eighth Congresses and served from April 2, 1918, until his death in Chicago, Illinois, on May 4, 1923.
Rainey was interred in Calvary Cemetery in Evanston.

See also
List of United States Congress members who died in office (1900–49)

References

External links
 

1880 births
1923 deaths
De La Salle Institute alumni
Democratic Party members of the United States House of Representatives from Illinois
20th-century American politicians
Burials at Calvary Cemetery (Evanston, Illinois)